Pool is an English and Dutch surname. Notable people with the surname include:

Albert-Jan Pool (born 1960), Dutch type designer
Andre Pool, Seychelles politician
Bettie Freshwater Pool (1860–1928), American writer and teacher from North Carolina
Bumper Pool (born 1999 as James Morris Pool), American football player
Cord Pool, American guitarist for Texas Hippie Coalition 
David de Sola Pool (1885–1970), Jewish spiritual leader from New York; father of Ithiel
E. Ion Pool (1858–1939), British marathon runner and Olympics critic
Ithiel de Sola Pool (1917–1984), pioneer in the development of social science; son of David
Hamp Pool (1915–2000), American football player
Hugh Pool (born 1964), American guitarist
Joe R. Pool (1911–1968), American politician from Texas
John Pool (1826–1884), American politician from North Carolina
Jonathan Pool (born 1942), American political scientist
Judith Graham Pool (1919–1975), American scientist, discoverer of cryoprecipitation
Juriaen Pool (1665–1745), Dutch painter, husband of Rachel Ruysch
Lafayette G. Pool (1919–1991), American tank-platoon commander in World War II
Léa Pool (born 1950), Swiss filmmaker, and film instructor in Quebec, Canada
Malcolm Pool (born 1943), British bass player with The Artwoods and other bands
Maria Louise Pool (1841–1898), American writer, best known for A Vacation in a Buggy
Matthijs Pool (1676–1732), Dutch engraver
Robert Roy Pool (born 1953), American screenwriter
Rosey E. Pool (1905–1971), Dutch translator, educator, and anthologist 
Solomon Pool (1832–1901), fourth president of the University of North Carolina
Steve Pool (born 1955), American weather anchor from Washington
Theodor Pool (1890–1942), Estonian politician and agronomist
Tim Pool (born 1986), American journalist and political commentator
Ted Pool (1906–1975), Australian football player
Victor Pool (born 1992), Dutch DJ
Walter F. Pool (1850–1883), American politician from North Carolina
Wim Pool (born 1927), Dutch sprint canoer

See also 
 Pool (disambiguation)

References

Surnames
English-language surnames
Dutch-language surnames
Estonian-language surnames
Surnames of English origin
Surnames of British Isles origin